My Teen Romantic Comedy SNAFU is a comedy, slice of life, drama Japanese anime based on My Youth Romantic Comedy Is Wrong, as I Expected, the light novel series written by Wataru Watari. Soubu High School is filled with many different types of teenagers all wanting to fit in. Despite preferring to be a loner, Hachiman Hikigaya is forced to join fellow loner, Yukino Yukinoshita and classmate, Yui Yuigahama in forming the Soubu High School Service Club. Also being linked by a car accident in the past, these three offer help to their fellow adolescents in dealing with the struggles and complicated psychology of being a teenager.

The first season was produced by Brain's Base and directed by Ai Yoshimura, with series composition by Shōtarō Suga, character design by Yū Shindō, art direction by Shigemi Ikeda, music by Monaca, and sound direction by Satoshi Motoyama. The series premiered on April 5, 2013, on TBS with later airings on MBS, CBC and BS-TBS. The twelve-episode season was followed by an extra thirteenth episode which aired on June 28, 2013, and an OVA episode on September 19, 2013, both of which were written by Watari.

The second season, titled My Teen Romantic Comedy SNAFU Too!, was produced by Studio feel. and directed by Kei Oikawa, with series composition by Shōtarō Suga, character designs by Yuichi Tanaka, music by Monaca and sound direction by Satoshi Motoyama. The thirteen-episode season premiered on April 3, 2015, and ran until June 26, 2015, on TBS with later airings on MBS, CBC, TUT and BS-TBS.

The third and final season, titled My Teen Romantic Comedy SNAFU Climax, was also produced by Studio feel. and directed by Kei Oikawa, with series composition by Keiichirō Ōchi (replacing Shōtarō Suga, who died in 2015), character designs by Yuichi Tanaka, music by Monaca, and sound direction by Satoshi Motoyama. The season was originally going to premiere on April 9, 2020, on TBS with later airings on MBS, CBC, and BS-TBS and streaming on Amazon Prime Video, before being delayed to July 2020 due to the COVID-19 pandemic. The anime's production used a "trial and error" process that accounts for the safety of the production staff.  The third season aired from July 9 to September 24, 2020.

Series overview

Episode list

Season 1 (2013)

Season 2: Too! (2015)

Season 3: Climax (2020)

OVAs

Notes

References

External links
Official anime website 
 

My Teen Romantic Comedy SNAFU episode lists